Rock Island Line may refer to:

Rock Island Line, the traditional song
Chicago, Rock Island and Pacific Railroad, believed to be the line mentioned in the traditional song
Rock Island District, the Metra commuter rail line
Rock Island Line (album), the Johnny Cash album

See also
 Rock Island Clean Line, an electrical distribution trunk line in the U.S. Midwest
 Rock Island Southern Railway, Illinois, USA
 Peoria and Rock Island Railroad, Illinois, USA
 Rock Island (disambiguation)
 Island Line (disambiguation)